This is a list of characters from the manga and anime series Dr. Stone.


Main characters

Senku Ishigami

 is a teenage prodigy who excels in multiple fields of science, with a special love of astronomy and space exploration. After awakening in the "Stone World", he sets to restore civilization by reinventing their lost technology and discovering a "cure" for the petrification. Though somewhat arrogant, he is actually very noble and kind-hearted as he considers science as a means to elevate all people and having unshakeable faith in his friends. After faking his death to keep Tsukasa from hunting him, Senku befriends the residents of Ishigami Village and becomes their chief, finding out that he is a legend in the village's community at the same time thanks to the influence through one of the villagers’ ancestors, who happens to be Senku's late adopted father Byakuya, one of the original petrification survivors. Following Hyoga's defeat and Tsukasa entering cryosleep, Senku was able to get the remnants of the Empire of Might to merge with the Kingdom of Science where he leads the Five Wise Generals.

Taiju Oki

 is Senku's best friend, whom Senku refers to as a "big oaf" or "musclehead". He has incredible strength and seemingly limitless stamina, but is a pacifist who's never thrown a punch in his life, preferring to turn the other cheek instead to prevent any assailants from hurting his friends. He is in love with Yuzuriha and will do anything to take care of her, especially when she's in danger. After Senku fakes his death to keep Tsukasa from hunting them, Taiju and Yuzuriha infiltrate the Tsukasa Empire to keep tabs on Tsukasa before rejoining Senku in Ishigami Village. As a member of the Power Team, Taiju leads its farming division while assisted by Yo and Magma.

Yuzuriha Ogawa

 is Taiju's love interest, a cheerful and kindhearted young woman. She enrolled in her high school's handicraft's club to pursue her goal of becoming a fashion designer, and is exceptionally talented at arts like stitching and clothwork. During the "Vs. Tsukasa" arc, Yuzuriha is taken captive by Tsukasa. Senku has her and Taiju join the Tsukasa Empire as part of his plan. During the "Age of Exploration" arc, Yuzuriha starts a clothing store while becoming a member of the Craftsmanship and Development Team.

Tsukasa Shishio

 is a youth who rose to fame in mixed martial arts as "The Strongest Primate High Schooler", being physically powerful enough to kill a lion with one punch. He wears a red ghi and is always barefoot. After being reawakened by Senku to save him and Taiju from a lion pack, Tsukasa wears the pelt of the male lion he killed while hunting for Senku and Taiju. He resents adults due to his experience with one who prevented him from gathering seashells for his ill sister Mirai, viewing the current adults as an avaricious corruption while seeking to create a new society in the "Stone World" by only reviving young people. Tsukasa serves as the primary antagonist of the manga's early story arcs, appearing to kill Senku when he refuses to back down from restoring their civilization before proceeding to establish his Empire of Might. Through he revived Gen to confirm Senku's death, Tsukasa remained in the dark of his opposition's survival until learning it from Hyoga. During the "Communications" arc, Tsukasa accepted a truce with Senku in exchange for the revival of his sister, after which Hyoga betrayed him. After Hyoga is defeated, the critical injuries Tsukasa suffered from the fight force him to be placed in cryosleep with his remaining forces absorbed into the Kingdom of Science. Though he does get to see Mirai get restored to good health beforehand. When Tsukasa is revived, he sides with Senku even after his sister was restored. He accompanied Senku on his trip to the United States of America while still striving for a morally pure world where the innocent will not be exploited.

Gen Asagiri

 is another person from the "old world", Gen is a silver-tongued self-help guru who styles himself as a mentalist. Gen wears an overcoat over his yakuta and is always barefoot except in the winter. He was revived by Tsukasa who wanted an ally who can think like Senku and confirm his death. But being self-serving, Gen ends up defecting to the Kingdom of Science after witnessing Senku's accomplishments. When the Kingdom of Science and the remnants of the Empire of Might merge following the defeat of Hyoga and Tsukasa entering cryosleep, Gen becomes one of the Five Wise Generals.

Chrome

 is a youth from Ishigami Village who named himself the village's self-proclaimed sorcerer when stumbled upon the basics of science and mistook them as sorcery, wanting to save Ruri. Chrome later learns about the scientific wonders of the old world and become Senku's partner as he helps him rediscover humanity's scientific legacy. When the Kingdom of Science and the remnants of the Tsukasa Empire merge following the defeat of Hyoga and Tsukasa entering cryosleep, Chrome becomes one of the Five Wise Generals and a part of the Craftsmanship and Development Team.

Kohaku

 is the strongest warrior of Ishigami Village and Ruri's younger sister, a tomboyish young woman who is exceptionally strong, agile, and sharp-eyed. She is the first villager Senku meets after awakening in the "Stone World" and becomes one of his staunchest allies as part of the Kingdom of Science's Power Team.

Suika

 is a young girl from Ishigami Village who wears a watermelon on her head to cover up her "fuzzy sickness". She ends up gravitating to Senku, helping him as he is the first person not to judge her for her eccentricities before he outfitted her watermelon helmet with customized lenses. Suika often helps Senku out by being a scout for different missions where she can withdraw into her watermelon helmet. Following the merging of the Kingdom of Science and the Tsukasa Empire, Suika becomes a member of the Intelligence Team. After the second worldwide petrification event, Suika is the only person to be released as part of a contingency put in place by the Kingdom of Science; as she grows into a teenager for the following seven years, she works alone to recreate the revival fluid, successfully bringing Senku and the others back.

Recurring characters

Kingdom of Science and Tsukasa Empire
When Tsukasa was revived and had some differences with Senku, two factions arose. The  was made by Senku to recreate the scientific achievements in the world. The  was made so that the strong can rule. When Hyoga was defeated and Tsukasa entered cryosleep, the remnants of the Tsukasa Empire merged with the Kingdom of Science which later gained new members from those who were freed from their petrification.

Hyoga is a tall and fairly-built man who is strong enough to take on 10 attackers. He is revived by Tsukasa during the "Vs. Hyoga" arc. Hyoga and some Tsukasa Empire fighters took on the Ishigami Village's finest until it was discovered that Gen rigged their weapons. During the "Communications" arc, he betrays Tsukasa causing an unlikely team-up between Senku and Tsukasa to defeat him. During the "Age of Exploration" arc, Hyoga had to accompany Senku who needed some additional muscle.

Homura is a member of the Tsukasa Empire who was a gymnast prior to the petrification and is the right-hand to Hyoga. Homura was released from her petrification and has an allegiance to Hyoga. Homura assisted Hyoga in the first attack on Ishigami Village where she snuck into the village and set fire to some of the huts. Her gymnastics prowess means her speed and agility are more than a match to Kohaku's. During the "Communications" arc sometime after Hyoga's defeat, she did do some surveillance on Ishigami Village. When Homura tried to sabotage the radio tower, Magma and Kinro cut the tree enabling Kohaku to catch her. During the "Age of Exploration" arc, Homura had to accompany Senku who needed some additional muscle.

Minami was a buxom journalist prior to petrification who has a knowledge of famous people. After being released from her petrification, Minami serves Tsukasa where she wears a leather dress and is always barefoot. Both of them agree that the world before the petrification was awful. When Hyoga was defeated and Tsukasa entered cryosleep, Minami is among those that join the Kingdom of Science where she joins their Intelligence Team. During the "Age of Exploration" arc, Minami and Gen barter for the stone formula so that they can reawaken Francois to recreate the camera.

Ukyo Saionji is an SDF Navy sailor and submarine sonar operator who was released from petrification by Tsukasa. He is an expert in different languages and has super-sensitive hearing. When he works with Tsukasa, Ukyo became an expert archer and one of Tsukasa's scouts. During the "Communications" arc, Ukyo attacked Chrome, Gen, and Magma when they were setting up telephone poles which ended with him capturing Chrome. When Senku and Gen made contact with him, Ukyo agreed to their terms in exchange for  a "no death" rule due to Tsukasa shattering petrified humans and suspecting that Hyoga had sacrificed their fellow warriors to the poisonous gas. Following Hyoga's defeat and Tsukasa entering cryosleep, Ukyo is among those that join the Kingdom of Science where he becomes one of the Five Wise Generals.

 / 

Niki Hanada is a fan of Lilian Weinberg who was revived by Tsukasa. Following Hyoga's defeat and Tsukasa entering cryosleep, Niki is among those that join the Kingdom of Science where she becomes part of the Power Team. She is usually the one who keeps Magma and Yō in line if they do something short-sighted.

Yō is a former police officer who was revived by Tsukasa and one of the Empire of Might members who quickly joining Senku's new Kingdom of Science as a member of the Power Team where he is occasionally butting heads with Magma. His most noticeable feature is a massive piece of stone covering his right eye which he later removed and gave it one of Tsukasa's men when faking his death upon Chrome's escape (though the stone eyepatch reappeared on him in later appearances). Then he worked with Yuzuriha to rebuild the petrified humans that Tsukasa shattered. As a former police officer, he can use both tonfa and an expert marksman, thus being granted by Senku a gun.

The prodigal youngest son of Nanami Conglomerate's owner who was revived by Senku in the "Age of Exploration" arc to be part of the Kingdom of Science as one of the Five Wise Generals. As an expert sailor, he was made the Captain of the Perseus which he helped build as part of the Craftsmanship and Development Team.

Francois is the butler and chef of Ryusui who is unsure what gender Francois is. During the "Age of Exploration" arc, they were revived by Senku and Ryusui to work for them.

Mirai Shishiō is the younger sister of Tsukasa. Prior to the Petrification, she was brain dead following a car accident. During the "Communications" arc, Mirai was restored by Senku where the formula also healed Mirai. She was sad to see her brother go into cryosleep. During the "Age of Exploration" arc, she stays by Tsukasa's side. During the "New America" arc, Mirai found that everybody lost their scars and uses the Petrification Device to heal Tsukasa.

The prodigal oldest son of Nanami Conglomerate's owner who was revived by his younger brother in the "Europe" arc. Despite being an expert on video game IT who can crack algorithm codes, he ran away from his family company, due to seeing Ryusui being too annoying to him prior to the day of first full-scaled worldwide petrification.

Ishigami Village inhabitants
It became the headquarters of the Kingdom of Science. A village chief is chosen from whoever makes it to the final part of the Ishigami Village games and wins. When a person becomes the village chief, that person is entitled to a lot of resources from Ishigami Village. Thanks to the late-founder, Byakuya, the legendary tales of his adoptive son, Senku is very famous amongst the village's community. Besides Chrome, Kohaku, and Suika, the following are the inhabitants of Ishigami Village:

A large inhabitant of Ishigami Village with a black beard and blonde hair who is the father of Kohaku and Ruri. He was the village chief of Ishigami Village at the time of Senku's reawakening and was part of Ishigami Village's older generation. While Kokuyo and Kohaku have butted heads over different things, he does care for Ruri when she was ill. When Senku wins the Ishigami Village games, he makes him the new village chief. During the "Vs. Hyoga" arc, Kokyo assisted in defending Ishigami Village from the Empire of Might fighters led by Hyoga.

One of Ishigami Village's guardsmen, a stern young man with a strong commitment to the rules who eventually joined Senku's group as part of the Power Team. Like Suika, he suffers from "fuzzy sickness" with Ginro his confidant before Suika realized it during the Ishigami games and Senku later providing him glasses in the aftermath. In addition, he also becomes part of the Power Team during the merging of the Kingdom of Science and the Tsukasa Empire. He loved his little brother, when he learned in both sadness and anger that Ibara had his unwitting servant Kirisame petrified both Ginro and Kohaku.

Kinro's younger brother and fellow guardsman, a frivolous young man with a tendency to panic and an overriding sense of self-interest. He becomes part of the Power Team.

She suffers from a debilitating illness that will likely kill her before adulthood and finding a cure becomes the first goal of Senku's "Kingdom of Science." Once she is cured of what turned out to be pneumonia, she reveals to everyone including Senku that the latter is a legend amongst the village's community, all comes from the influences from one of the villagers’ ancestors, who happens to be Senku's late adoptive father, Byakuya.

An elderly but ripped artisan from Ishigami Village, he becomes a staunch ally and eventually a close friend of Senku and Chrome's because their quest for science resonates with his passion for crafting. While having designed and built much of Ishigami Village, Kaseki used his artisan abilities to create Kohaku's shield and items from Senku's diagrams with little practice like glass, engines, and vacuum tubes.

An inhabitant of Ishigami Village who is a stickler for rules. During the "Village Games" arc, Jasper served as a match judge.

An inhabitant of Ishigami Village. She is often seen in the company of Jasper.

An inhabitant of Ishigami Village who is the strongest of its inhabitants and helps to defend it from attacks, having intended to take over the village before accepting Senku as their leader. As a member of the Power Team following the merging of the Kingdom of Science and the Tsukasa Empire, he takes a liking to Taiju due to his unlimited stamina as seen when Magma watched him tend to the fields where he did not tire out. At one point, Magma mistook Gen as a sorcerer.

A inhabitant of Ishigami Village with dwarfism who idolizes Magma and does his dirty work.

A bald-headed inhabitant of Ishigami Village with great photographic memory and a member of the Power Team. He is often shown shirtless, has an X-scar on top of his head, and is always barefoot. As a baby, Soyuz was originally from an island that Senku named "Treasure Island", also known as "Petrification Kingdom", before he was cast off, presumably sometimes after surviving a hostile take over caused by Ibara. Soyuz is the son of the leader of his birth kingdom, whom Ibara petrified. Following Senku defeating Ibara, Soyuz became the new leader of the Petrification Kingdom.

A fat inhabitant of Ishigami Village who is the residential glutton. He was starting to get tired of fish every day until Senku managed to recreate ramen.

An inhabitant of Ishigami Village who is Ganen's father.

An inhabitant of Ishigami Village who is Sagan's wife and Ganen's mother.

An inhabitant of Ishigami Village who is Kinro and Ginro's father.

An inhabitant of Ishigami Village who is Kinro and Ginro's mother and the wife of Tetsuken.

An inhabitant of Ishigami Village.

An inhabitant of Ishigami Village and the wife of Alabaster.

An inhabitant of Ishigami Village with black hair who is the daughter of Alabaster and Dia and the sister of Garnet and Sapphire. She and her sisters are described by Kohaku to be the most prettiest girls in Ishigami Village.

An inhabitant of Ishigami Village with long blonde hair who is the daughter of Alabaster and Dia and the sister of Ruby and Sapphire.

An inhabitant of Ishigami Village with shoulder-length blonde hair who is the daughter of Alabaster and Dia and the sister of Ruby and Garnet.

An inhabitant of Ishigami Village.

An inhabitant of Ishigami Village and the wife of Carbo.

An elderly inhabitant of Ishigami Village who is the father of Carbo.

An elderly inhabitant of Ishigami Village who is the wife of Natri and the mother of Carbo.

A young buck-toothed girl who lives in Ishigami Village. She becomes a member of the Power Team.

A short inhabitant of Ishigami Village who is a residential artist.

Chalk is a dog in Ishigami Village that is owned by Suika.

Sagara is a Japanese boar that is adopted by Suika. He came in handy when it came to finding some oil.

Petrification Kingdom
The  is a kingdom that is located on Treasure Island. Its inhabitants are the descendants of the International Space Station crew. Soyuz came from this island as he is the son of the unnamed leader. The following characters reside in the Petrification Kingdom:

Ibara is the Minister of the Petrification Kingdom until he usurped the unnamed ruler who was Soyuz' father and used the Petrification Device to petrify him and punish different people. When Senku arrived on the island, he got into a tug-of-war with Ibara. Thanks to a trick that Ryusui planned out, Senku used the voice com to frighten Ibara and use the Petrification Device on him. This enabled Soyuz to become the new ruler of the Petrification Kingdom.

Amaryllis is an inhabitant of the Petrification Kingdom. She sides with Senku when it comes to his plans to overthrow Ibara only for Ibara to use the Petrification Device on everyone. Upon being restored after Senku defeated Ibara, Amaryllis assists Soyuz in restoring the people of the Petrification Kingdom.

Kirisame is a female inhabitant of the Petrification Kingdom who is one of the strongest warriors. In her first appearance, she was responsible for the petrification of the Perseus' crew. Kirisame is among those petrified by Ibara's Petrification Device. After Senku defeated Ibara, Kirisame was among those restored and recognized Soyuz as Treasure Island's new ruler. Kirisame later joins up with the Kingdom of Science.

Matsukaze is an inhabitant of the Petrification Kingdom who petrified himself centuries ago in the event in which many Petrification Weapons fell from the sky. At some point, his petrified body ended up in the sea and was collected by Taiju. Matsukaze was left petrified as he was missing an arm. When his arm was salvaged and reattached, Matsukaze was restored and saw that Ginro resembled his late master. He joins the Kingdom of Science where he becomes Ginro's bodyguard.

Oarashi is a warrior of the Petrification Kingdom who sports a jackal headdress. While he is strong enough to throw Magma and Kinro, he was no match for Taiju.

Mozu is an inhabitant of the Petrification Kingdom who is one of the strongest warriors. Because of this, he believed himself to be naturally talented at fighting, so he preferred to slack around rather than hone his skills. He is later among the those petrified by Ibara's Petrification Device. Following Ibara's defeat, Mozu is restored by Senku at Hyoga's suggestion and he joins up with the Kingdom of Science.

American Colony
The following are members of the American colony:

A former NASA scientist, Dr Xeno is the leader of the colony formed in the United States and is a scientific genius on par with Senku.

Stanley Snyder is a military operative and Dr. Xeno's second in command.

Brody Dudley is a military officer and the mechanic of the American colony.

Other characters

International Space Station crew
The following are the astronauts on the International Space Station at the time when the people of Earth were petrified:

Byakuya is the adoptive father of Senku, a former teacher, and one of the astronauts on the International Space Station at the time when the people of Earth were petrified. When he and his fellow astronauts returned to Earth and found what happened, Byakuya led them into establishing Ishigami Village. In addition, Byakuya gathered the rare metals that can be used by Senku when he finally becomes unpetrified. By the time Senku woke up, Byakuya was long dead. In the "Village Origins" arc, Senku found a time capsule disk from a glass bottle that Byakuya left him after learning from the Hundred Tales.

; Laura Pitt-Pulford (singing voice) (Both languages)
Lillian Weinberg was an American pop star who was one of the astronauts on the International Space Station at the time when the people of Earth were petrified. They are the ancestors of people from Ishigami Village. She has blonde hair which got passed down to some of her descendants. Lillian fell ill due to pneumonia and died in the process, thus ending her soothing voice and music career. The only thing left behind was the song Byakua recorded in the time capsule glass disc.

Connie Lee was a NASA personnel who was one of the astronauts on the International Space Station at the time when the people of Earth were petrified. She fell ill due to pneumonia and died in the process.

 (Шамил Волков)

Shamil Volkov was a Russian cosmonaut, a former pilot, and husband of Connie Lee who was one of the astronauts on the International Space Station at the time when the people of Earth were petrified. He helped to establish Ishigami Village. He fell ill due to pneumonia and died in the process.

 (Дария Никитина)

Darya Nikitina was a Russian cosmonaut and doctor who was one of the astronauts on the International Space Station at the time when the people of Earth were petrified. She and her husband were lost at sea while trying to get medicine for Connie.

 (Яков Никитин)

Yakov Nikitin was a Russian cosmonaut, doctor, and husband of Darya Nikitina who was one of the astronauts on the International Space Station at the time when the people of Earth were petrified. He and his wife were lost at sea while trying to get medicine for Connie.

References

External links
 
 

Dr. Stone